Agave nizandensis is a relatively small member of the genus Agave, in the family Asparagaceae. It is rare species endemic to a small region in the State of Oaxaca in southern Mexico.

Description
Agave nizandensis produces a basal leaf rosette of up to 60 cm (2 foot) in diameter. Leaves are dark green with a pale stripe down the centre, and about 1 foot long and 1 inch wide, ending in blunt red spines at the tips. Edges are slightly jagged. Flowers are yellowish green and grow on a spike of 2-3.3 feet high.

Cultivation
Agave nizandensis can be propagated vegetatively or by seed.

References

nizandensis
Flora of Oaxaca